State Route 169 (SR 169) is a  state highway from SR 6 in Springfield to U.S. Route 1 (US 1) in Danforth. It runs concurrently with SR 170 for its first  and intersects SR 171 in the unincorporated territory of Prentiss.

Major junctions

See also

References

External links

Floodgap Roadgap's RoadsAroundME: Maine State Route 169

169
Transportation in Penobscot County, Maine
Transportation in Washington County, Maine